The Minister for Social Housing was a short lived ministry in the government of New South Wales, established in the Second Baird ministry and largely shared responsibility with the Minister for Family and Community Services. Any separation was nominal however as both ministries were held by Brad Hazzard and then Pru Goward. It was abolished in the second Berejiklian ministry.

Role and responsibilities
The portfolio shared responsibility for the following legislation:

Aboriginal Housing Act 1998, jointly with the portfolio of Family and Community Services
Community Housing Providers (Adoption of National Law) Act 2012, jointly with the portfolio of Family and Community Services
Housing Act 2001, jointly with the portfolio of Family and Community Services
Residential Tenancies Act 2010, Part 7 Social housing tenancy agreements, jointly with the portfolio of Innovation and Better Regulation.

List of ministers

Notes

References

Social Housing
New South Wales